There are currently seven newspapers published in print or online in Saint Lucia.

Current newspapers:
 Caribbean News NowCaribbean News Now covers the major events that are happening on the Caribbean Islands. Caribbean News Now provides their own Facebook page, for the islanders and world to stay up to date through Facebook sharing pictures and links to news information sources. The website also provides the COVID-19 statistics for each country and the numbers of people who have it, how many have recovered, and the number of deaths from the virus. Current travel information is provided for tourists and locals that live there, and the type of precautions they are taking for the safety of travelers and the locals who work in high volume tourist areas being provided a vaccination as a first priority[1]
There is a news menu bar provided with information on sources about region, world, health, education, entertainment &lifestyle, citizenship & migration, politics. An opinion and letters tab is available to click on to see what people have written to the news editor. A Features page is provided and so is an announcement page.
OneLucian News, founded in 2001
 The St Lucia Mirror
 St. Lucia Times, website, Started on March 31, 2014, Big Feat Media
 St. Lucia News Online,  officially launched on Oct. 1, 2012.,  Gros Islet, website
 The Star, established in 1987, published weekly (Saturday), founded by Rick and Mae Wayne
The Voice of Saint Lucia, The Voice (1885 ), Castries, 

Based on records in the British Archives, the following newspapers were published in Saint Lucia:
The Independent Press (18431844),  
The Observer (1874), 
Saint Lucia Herald (19621965), 
Saint Lucia Observer (18741876), Castries, 
The Palladium, and Saint Lucia Free Press (1839 to 1840),

References

 Search of the National Archives of the UK for Saint Lucia newspapers

Saint Lucia
Newspapers